"Girls Like You" is a song recorded by American band Maroon 5 from their sixth studio album Red Pill Blues (2017). The track was written by lead singer Adam Levine, Starrah, Gian Stone, Cirkut, and Jason Evigan, with the latter two serving as producers. A second version featuring and co-written by American rapper Cardi B, was released on May 30, 2018, as the album's  fifth and final single. The single version was included on the re-release edition of the album.

The song's accompanying music video was directed by David Dobkin, which features the band and Levine performing the song in the center of a room and a number of women making their appearances. The single achieved commercial success, spending seven weeks at number one on the US Billboard Hot 100 chart, making it Maroon 5's fourth and Cardi B's third chart-topper, who extended her record for most number-ones among female rappers. It also spent 33 weeks in the top 10, tying both Ed Sheeran's "Shape of You" and Post Malone and Swae Lee's "Sunflower" for the longest top 10 run in the chart's archives at the time and a record-setting 36 weeks at number one on the Adult Contemporary chart. Additionally, it reached number one in eleven other countries, including Canada and New Zealand.

The song was certified Diamond by the Recording Industry Association of America (RIAA) in 2021 for selling more than 10 million units, with Cardi B becoming the first female rapper to achieve two Diamond certifications. According to the International Federation of the Phonographic Industry (IFPI) it was the fifth-best selling song of 2018, with equivalent sales of 11.9 million units globally. "Girls Like You" ranked at number five on the Billboard decade-end chart for the 2010s, with Cardi B being the only female rapper on the top 40. Its music video has surpassed 3 billion views on YouTube.  "Girls Like You" has won multiple awards, including at the 2019 Billboard Music Awards for Top Hot 100 Song, and received a nomination for Best Pop Duo/Group Performance at the 61st Grammy Awards. It was ranked at 30 on Billboards Greatest Hot 100 Hits of All Time, published in November 2021.

Background 
"Girls Like You" was released as the ninth track on Red Pill Blues via Apple Music. On May 30, 2018, Maroon 5 announced a new version of the song with rapper Cardi B, as the fifth and final single from the album, following the song "Wait", which was later released on iTunes on that day. The band released four remix versions of "Girls Like You" on August 2, 2018, featuring St. Vincent, Tokimonsta, Cray and WondaGurl. In an interview with Variety, Levine stated he told Cardi before she wrote her verse, "I want you to put something down that shows your fierceness as a woman and say it however you want."

Composition 
"Girls Like You" is a pop and pop rock song. It has a length of three minutes and 35 seconds in the original version, while the extended single version is 20 seconds longer. It was written by Adam Levine, Cirkut, Cardi B, Starrah, Jason Evigan and Gian Stone and was produced by Cirkut and Evigan.

The song is written in the key of C major with a tempo of 125 beats per minute. It moves in common time, with Levine's vocals spanning from C3 to C5.

Critical reception 
“Girls Like You” received mixed to negative reviews from critics. Shaad D'Souza of Vice  wrote, "Maroon 5, please don't ruin Cardi B," described the song as an example of "God awful, horrid, weird, marshmallow-soft songs sung by dudes pining after a ‘good girl’ who will finally fix all of their problems through the power of love", and deemed Cardi B's verse the best and only interesting part of the song, which considered "basically the antithesis of Adam Levine's whole weird muscular robot thing."

Time staff called it "more headache than hit" but acknowledged "Cardi B's verse as the only saving grace" of the song.

Spin staff described it as "profoundly shallow" as well as a "snoozefest, which trafficks in sentimental and borderline meaningless platitudes" and stated "[the song] dominated the charts thanks in no small part to walking charisma factory Cardi B."

Commercial performance 
"Girls Like You" debuted at number 94 on the US Billboard Hot 100, and ascended to number four following its first full week of tracking after the music video's arrival. The single made the fourth-biggest jump (90 positions) in the Hot 100's history, and became Maroon 5's 14th and Cardi B's sixth top-ten single overall. After spending six weeks at number two behind Drake's "In My Feelings", the single reached number one on its 17th charting week, becoming Maroon 5's fourth chart topper–their first since 2012's "One More Night"–and Cardi B's third. Cardi extended her record for most number ones among female rappers. Maroon 5 became the duo or group with the most Hot 100 number ones in the 21st century.

"Girls Like You" became the first pop song to lead the chart after the record run of 34 consecutive weeks that rap songs had ruled the Hot 100, from January to September 2018. The single spent seven weeks atop the Hot 100, making Cardi the female rapper with the most cumulative weeks atop the chart, with eleven weeks. With 33 weeks in the top 10, it tied Ed Sheeran's "Shape of You" for the longest top 10 run in the chart's archives. Also tied by Post Malone and Swae Lee's "Sunflower" in 2019, with the record was later broken by Malone's "Circles" in 2020, and The Weeknd's "Blinding Lights" in 2021. "Girls Like You" also spent 36 consecutive weeks at number one on the Adult Contemporary, breaking the previous record on the chart was Uncle Kracker's 2003 version of "Drift Away" for 28 weeks.

With "Girls Like You" following "I Like It" at the top of Radio Songs, Cardi B became the first female rapper to ever replace herself at number one on that chart. With 16 weeks on top, it tied Mariah Carey's "We Belong Together" and No Doubt's "Don't Speak" for the second longest-leading number one on the Radio Songs chart, while matching Carey for the longest leading this century. With the single, the band scored its record-extending 13th number one on the Adult Top 40 radio airplay chart.

Music video 

The music video premiered on YouTube, on May 31, 2018, at midnight 12AM (EDT) and was directed by David Dobkin. It follows Adam Levine, alone with a microphone in the center of a room, where the band playing instruments in the background, then a rotating assortment of women doing lip-syncing and dancing to the song around with Levine. The video featured appearances from Maroon 5's band members: guitarist James Valentine, keyboardist and rhythm guitarist Jesse Carmichael, bassist Mickey Madden, drummer Matt Flynn, keyboardist PJ Morton and multi-instrumentalist Sam Farrar, with the song's featured artist Cardi B.

In order of appearance, the video includes a number of women ranging from athletes, activists, actresses, models and singers who are making their cameos: Camila Cabello, Phoebe Robinson, Aly Raisman, Sarah Silverman, Gal Gadot, Lilly Singh, Amani al-Khatahtbeh, Trace Lysette, Tiffany Haddish, Angy Rivera, Franchesca Ramsey, Millie Bobby Brown, Ellen DeGeneres, Jennifer Lopez, Chloe Kim, Alex Morgan, Mary J. Blige, Beanie Feldstein, Jackie Fielder, Danica Patrick, Ilhan Omar, Elizabeth Banks, Ashley Graham and Rita Ora, with Levine's wife Behati Prinsloo and their daughter Dusty Rose.

The clothing worn by the guests of the music video features several messages that represent various social justice and identity movements. Immigrant rights activist Angy Rivera of New York State Youth Leadership Council wears her organization's T-shirt with the phrase "Undocumented Unafraid Unapologetic". Olympic gymnast Aly Raisman wore a T-shirt with the phrase "Always Speak Your Truth". Jackie Fielder, founder of indigenous-led San Francisco Defund DAPL Coalition, wore a T-shirt with the words "Divest, Water is Life".

"Girls Like You" topped YouTube's 2018 Songs of the Summer list globally, and ranked third in the United States. It is also Vevo's most viewed video of 2018. The video was named the 23rd-most iconic pop music video of the 2010s by PopSugar.

Alternative videos 
Two alternate versions of the video were released, both directed by Dobkin. The first version is a vertical video which was released exclusively on Spotify, on August 27, 2018. Similar to the original video, it focuses on the same women singing and dancing in rotation, with the exception of Cabello. The second version, simply titled Volume 2, was released on October 16, 2018, on YouTube. This version includes additional footage and Cabello. The video ends with the voice of Dobkin saying "cut" and the sound of people clapping. In the second half of Volume 2, Levine briefly wears a t-shirt with the words "Liberation Not Deportation", created by the organization, NYSYLC.

Lyric video 
The band released a lyric video of the original song on February 14, 2019 (Valentine's Day). The animated video follows Adam Levine's journey growing up, becoming a musician, forming the band now known as Maroon 5 and performing a sold-out concert. Levine is shown driving with various women in his car then spending time alone and focusing on his music. Finally, he meets and falls in love with Behati Prinsloo. They date, get married, and start a family at the end.

Live performances 
On May 30, 2018, Maroon 5 performed "Girls Like You" for the first time in Tacoma, Washington from the Red Pill Blues Tour, where they also performed a cover version of "Forever Young" by Alphaville, as a tribute to their late manager Jordan Feldstein. On February 3, 2019, the band performed this song and featured the Georgia State University Marching Band for the Super Bowl LIII halftime show in Atlanta, Georgia, while Cardi B also performed a solo version of the song for Bud Light Super Bowl Music Fest, the night before.

In March 2019, Maroon 5 playing it for the Indian couple Akash Ambani and Shloka Mehta from their wedding ceremony at the Bandra Kurla Complex in Mumbai, India. On June 8, 2019, they also performed for the music festival concert, Capital's Summertime Ball at Wembley Stadium, London.

On October 25, the band performed "Girls Like You" for a live concert at Seminole Hard Rock Hotel & Casino in Hollywood, Florida.

Awards and nominations

Track listing 

Digital download – Original
 "Girls Like You" – 3:35

Digital download – Remix
 "Girls Like You" (featuring Cardi B) – 3:55

Digital download – Cray Remix
 "Girls Like You" (Cray Remix) (featuring Cardi B) – 3:57

Digital download – St. Vincent Remix
 "Girls Like You" (St. Vincent Remix) (featuring Cardi B) – 3:31

Digital download – Tokimonsta Remix
 "Girls Like You" (Tokimonsta Remix) (featuring Cardi B) – 3:33

Digital download – WondaGurl Remix
 "Girls Like You" (WondaGurl Remix) – 3:35

Credits and personnel 
Credits adapted from AllMusic and Tidal.

Maroon 5

 Adam Levine – lead vocals, rhythm guitar, songwriting, executive production
 Jesse Carmichael – keyboards, synthesizers, rhythm guitar, backing vocals
 Mickey Madden – bass
 James Valentine – lead guitar, backing vocals
 Matt Flynn – drums, percussion, electronic drums
 PJ Morton – keyboards, synthesizers, piano, backing vocals
 Sam Farrar – rhythm guitar, keyboards, synthesizers, samples, bass, backing vocals, programming, production

Additional personnel
 Cardi B – featured vocals, songwriter
 Cirkut – producer, songwriter, keyboards, backing vocals, programming
 Jason Evigan – producer, songwriter, programming, additional guitars, keyboards
 Noah Passavoy – recording, additional keyboards, backing vocals
 Isaiah Tejada – keyboards, synths
 Gian Stone – songwriter, backing vocals
 Starrah – songwriter
 Serban Ghenea – mixing

Recording
 Recorded at Conway Recording Studios, Los Angeles, California

Charts

Weekly charts

Year-end charts

Decade-end charts

All-time charts

Certifications

Release history

See also 
 List of Airplay 100 number ones of the 2010s
 List of Billboard Hot 100 number-one singles of 2018
 List of Canadian Hot 100 number-one singles of 2018
 List of number-one songs of 2018 (Malaysia)
 List of number-one songs of 2018 (Singapore)
 List of Billboard Adult Contemporary number ones of 2018 and 2019 (U.S.)
 List of most liked YouTube videos
 List of most-viewed YouTube videos

References

Notes

Citations 

2017 songs
2018 singles
222 Records singles
Billboard Hot 100 number-one singles
Body image in popular culture
Canadian Hot 100 number-one singles
Interscope Records singles
Maroon 5 songs
Cardi B songs
Songs written by Adam Levine
Songs written by Cardi B
Songs written by Cirkut (record producer)
Songs written by Jason Evigan
Song recordings produced by Cirkut (record producer)
Song recordings produced by Jason Evigan
Songs written by Starrah
Number-one singles in Iceland
Number-one singles in Israel
Number-one singles in Lebanon
Number-one singles in Malaysia
Number-one singles in New Zealand
Number-one singles in Romania
Number-one singles in Singapore
Number-one singles in Venezuela
Songs about dancing
Songs with feminist themes
Music videos directed by David Dobkin
Animated music videos
Vertically-oriented music videos